Ornithinicoccus halotolerans is a Gram-positive bacterium species from the genus Ornithinicoccus which has been isolated from desert soil from Xinjiang in China.

References

External links
Type strain of Ornithinicoccus halotolerans at BacDive -  the Bacterial Diversity Metadatabase

Intrasporangiaceae
Bacteria described in 2016